Atto di dolore is an Italian film released in 1990. It stars Claudia Cardinale.

Plot
In Milan, Elena (Cardinale), widowed, has to raise her two children Martina and Sandro alone. Life takes a turn for the worse when Sandro becomes a drug addict. Despite his mother's attempts, the boy is unable to rid of his addiction. Sandro becomes violent towards his mother and she eventually decides to kill him.

Cast
Claudia Cardinale:	Elena
Bruno Cremer: Armando
Karl Zinny: Sandro
Giulia Boschi: Martina
Memè Perlini: Ramella
Ferruccio De Ceresa: Salvi
Enrico Lo Verso: Geraci
Clara Colosimo: Contessa Cini
Gabriele Muccino: Zico

References

External links

1990 films
1990s Italian-language films
Films directed by Pasquale Squitieri
Italian drama films
1990s Italian films